Encyclia oncidioides is a species of orchid. The diploid chromosome number of E. oncidioides has been determined as 2n = 40.

Synonyms
Epidendrum oncidioides  Lindl. (Basionym)
Epidendrum ensiforme Vell. 
Epidendrum gravidum Lindl. 
Epidendrum guillemianum  Lindl. ex Planch. 
Epidendrum longifolium Barb.Rodr. 
Epidendrum sintenisii Rchb.f. 
Epidendrum monticola Fawc. & Rendle. 
Encyclia longifolia (Barb.Rodr.) Schltr. 
Encyclia gravida (Lindl.) Schltr. 
Encyclia sintenisii (Rchb.f.) Britton 
Epidendrum oncidioides var. gravidum (Lindl.) Ames 
Encyclia monticola (Fawc. & Rendle) Acuña 
Encyclia ensiformis (Vell.) Hoehne 
Encyclia oncidioides var. gravida (Lindl.) Hoehne 
Encyclia vellozoana Pabst 
Encyclia cardimii Pabst & A.F.Mello

References

oncidioides
oncidioides